This is a list of wars involving the Socialist Republic of Vietnam and its predecessor states.

Pre-modern

Ancient (204 BC–111 BC) 
The Han–Nanyue War is considered to be the first war with clear authenticity in Vietnamese history.

Dominated (111 BC–905 AD)

First and Second Chinese Domination (111 BC – 544 AD)

Early Lý Dynasty (545–602)

Third Chinese Domination (602–905)

Dynastic

Autonomous era under Khúc Family (905–938) and Ngô Dynasty (938–967)

Warlord era (944–968)

Đinh Dynasty (968–980)

Early Lê Dynasty (980–1009)

Later Lý Dynasty (1009–1225)

Trần Dynasty (1225–1400)

Hồ Dynasty (1400–1407)

Fourth Chinese Domination (1407–1427)

Later Lê Dynasty (1428–1778)

Tây Sơn Dynasty (1778–1802)

Nguyễn Dynasty (1802–1887)

Early Modern (1527–1887) 
 Lê-Mạc War (1533–1677)
 Trịnh–Nguyễn War (1627–1672)
 Cambodian Civil War (1714–1717)
 Cambodian Civil War (1747–1750)
 Siamese–Vietnamese War (1771–1773)
 Tây Sơn rebellion (1771–1789)
 Tây Sơn–Nguyễn war (1771–1787)
 Tây Sơn–Siam war (1785)
 Tây Sơn–Trịnh war (1786)
 Tây Sơn brothers war (1787–1788)
 Qing (Chinese) intervention (1788–1789)
 Second Tây Sơn–Nguyễn war (1789–1802)
 Tây Sơn–Vientiane war (1790–1791): Tây Sơn invaded the Kingdom of Vientiane.
 Vietnamese invasions of Cambodia (1813–1845)
 Cambodian rebellion (1811–1812)
 Cambodian rebellion (1820)
 Lao rebellion (1826–1828)
 Siamese–Vietnamese War (1831–1834)
 Cambodian rebellion (1835–39)
 Cambodian rebellion (1840)
 Siamese–Vietnamese War (1841–1845)
 Ja Lidong's Rebellion (1822–1823)
 Phan Bá Vành's Rebellion (1825–1827)
 Nông Văn Vân's Rebellion (1833–1835)
 Lê Văn Khôi revolt (1833–1835)
 Ja Thak Wa uprising (1834–1835)
 Cao Bá Quát's Rebellion (1854–1856)
 Taiping invasions of Northern Vietnam (1850s–1870s)
 Haw wars
 French conquest of Vietnam (1858–1887)
 Cochinchina Campaign (1858–1862)
 Tạ Văn Phụng's Rebellion (1861–1865)
 Văn Thân movement (1864–1885)
 Tonkin Campaign (1883–1889)
 Sino–French War (1884–1885)

Colonial

French Indochina (1887–1954)

Republic

North Vietnam (1945–1976)

State of  Vietnam and South Vietnam (1945–1975)

Vietnam

Notes

Citations

References 

 
Vietnam
Wars